Riccardo Ruotolo (15 November 1928 – 1 August 2012) was the titular bishop of Castulo and auxiliary bishop of the Catholic Archdiocese of Manfredonia-Vieste-San Giovanni Rotondo, Italy.

Ordained to the priesthood in 1951, Ruotolo became bishop in 1995 and he was 25 years (1978-2003) special delegate of the Holy See and president of the "Fondazione casa Sollievo della Sofferenza, Opera di San Pio da Pietrelcina".

He retired in 2004 and died on 2012.;

Notes

Resources
Profile of Mons. Ruotolo www.catholic-hierarchy.org

20th-century Italian titular bishops
Bishops in Apulia
1928 births
2012 deaths
21st-century Italian titular bishops